Robert John Odenkirk (born October 22, 1962) is an American actor, comedian and filmmaker, best known for his role as Saul Goodman on the AMC crime drama series Breaking Bad and its spin-off Better Call Saul. He directed three films, Melvin Goes to Dinner (2003), Let's Go to Prison (2006), and The Brothers Solomon (2007). He was also an executive producer of the sketch comedy show The Birthday Boys.

From the late 1980s to 1990s, Odenkirk wrote for television shows Saturday Night Live and The Ben Stiller Show.

Film

Television

Video games

Music videos

Discography

References

External links

 Bob Odenkirk at Rotten Tomatoes

Male actor filmographies
American filmographies